

Births and deaths 
 Savourna Stevenson (born 1961)

Recordings
 1960 "Singing The Fishing" (Ewan MacColl)
 1961 "Scottish Choice" (The Galliards)
 1962 "The Body Blow" (Ewan MacColl)
 1963 "On The Edge" (Ewan MacColl)
 1964 "The Travelling People" (Ewan MacColl)
 1964 "Scottish Ballad Book" (Jean Redpath)
 1965 "Corrie Folk Trio" (The Corries)
 1966 "Those Wild Corries" (The Corries)
 1966 "Mirrormans Sequences" (Robin Williamson)
 1967 "Bonnet Belt and Sword" (The Corries)
 1967 "Before And After" (Hamish Imlach)
 1968 "The Hangman's Beautiful Daughter" (Incredible String Band)
 1968 "Kishmul's Galley" (The Corries)
 1969 "Scottish Love Songs" (The Corries)
 1969 "The Fate o' Charlie" (Barbara Dickson and Archie Fisher)

Scottish music
1960s in Scotland
1960s in British music